Bacthafucup (stylized as BacTHAfucUP, BacTHAfu*UP or B.T.F.U) is the first studio album by Indian singer and songwriter Karan Aujla, Music produced by Tru Skool. The album was released on 15 September 2021 by Times Music and Speed Records, with the music video for "Chu Gon Do?" releasing on 8 July 2021. It consists of 13 tracks, and features Harjit Harman, 5 Rivers, Nave Suave, Gurlez Akhtar, and Amaal. The album was streamed more than 95 million times on Spotify

Background 

In November 2020, Karan Aujla announced that he was working on his debut album, and revealed Tru Skool as producer of the album. In May 2021, Aujla titled the album as BacDAfucUP, and in June 2021, the album's intro was released by Speed Records under its final title, BacTHAfucUP. Aujla released the track listing on 2 July 2021. On 8 July 2021, Aujla released "Chu Gon Do"'s music video, directed by Rupan Bal. In an interview Aujla disclosed that each track from the album is of a different kind, and also disclosed that there would be a surprise collaboration on the album. In an interview with Red FM Canada, Karan said that the album would be out on 30 July 2021. However, the album was delayed.

On 2 September, Karan released the second intro for album, "Vibe Check", and stated that the album would be about Punjabi folk music. He also showed some snippets of 3-4 songs from the album. In the intro he announced that the official video of the song "Click that B Kickin It" would be released on 9 September, and the full album will be out on 15 September.

On 9 September 2021, the official video for "Click That B Kickin it" was released, which was directed by Rupan Bal.

The full album was released on all streaming platforms on 15 September 2021.

Chart performance 
The track "Chu Gon Do" debuted at number 6 on the UK Asian chart published by the Official Charts Company. The album charted on the Billboard Top Canadian Albums at #19. On 27 September Karan Aujla Became No 1 Digital Artist In India. And 37 In The World.

Track listing

Personnel 
 Karan Aujla – vocals, writer
 Harjit Harman – featured artist
 Gurlez Akhtar – featured artist
 Amaal Nuux – featured artist
 Satnam Singh 5 Rivers – featured artist
 Mad Yardies – featured artist
 Nave Scave – featured artist

Technical personnel 
 Tru Skool – producer
 Teel L – mixing and mastering

Video directors 
 Rupan Bal – for tracks "Chu Gon Do", "Click That B Kickin It", "Here & There", "Addi Sunni", "It Aint Legal" and "Ask About Me"
 Sagar Deol & Janik Rai – for tracks "Intro", "Vibe Check" (second intro)
 B2getherpros – for "Intro"
 Saffron Studios – for Vibe Check" (second intro)

Others 
 Sandeep Rehaan – presentation 
 Deep Rehaan and Mangal Suniel – projection
 Dilpreet VFX – editor, colorist, VFX for videos 
 Simar – visuals 
 The Atomic Agency – album art

Charts

References 

2021 albums
Hip hop albums by Indian artists